Esfahani is an Iranian surname. Notable people with the surname include:

 Abdas-Samad Esfahani, Iranian Sufi
 Abu al-Hasan al-Esfahani, Iranian grand ayatollah
 Asir-e Esfahani, Persian poet
 Bondari Esfahani, Persian historian and translator
 Mahan Esfahani, Iranian-American keyboardist
 Mohammad Esfahani, Iranian pop music singer

Persian-language surnames
Isfahan